Calonectria ilicicola is a fungal plant pathogen in the family Nectriaceae. It has been found to cause leaf spot in holly (Ilex spp.), root rot in blueberry, red crown rot in soybean, a root and crown rot of anthurium, and a soft rot of ginger.

See also
 List of soybean diseases

References

Fungal plant pathogens and diseases
Nectriaceae
Soybean diseases
Fungi described in 1950
Taxa named by Karel Bernard Boedijn